The Dark Order is a professional wrestling stable, currently performing in All Elite Wrestling (AEW). The stable consists of Evil Uno, Stu Grayson, John Silver, Alex Reynolds, and Brodie Lee Jr.

The group debuted on the inaugural Double or Nothing pay-per-view, with Evil Uno and Stu Grayson as the first members. The stable also included several unnamed masked wrestlers. The next year, Mr. Brodie Lee made his AEW debut and was revealed as the leader (and "exalted one") of the stable. During this period, several wrestlers were inducted into the group. Lee would ultimately defeat Cody Rhodes to win the TNT Championship.

However, Brodie Lee died only months later. AEW subsequently hosted the Brodie Lee Celebration of Life, where members of the Dark Order competed in (and won) each match and Lee's son was appointed as the honorary new leader of the stable, as the group turned face.

Beyond these known members, the group has also been shown to have masked, unnamed henchmen dubbed as "creepers" that, when the group are portrayed as heels, join them in beatdowns and other disruptive acts.

Background

Uno and Grayson previously teamed together as the Super Smash Brothers and were known primarily for their work in Chikara and Pro Wrestling Guerrilla (PWG). Reynolds and Silver previously teamed together as the Beaver Boys, and were known for their work in Combat Zone Wrestling (CZW). Both tag teams were one-time PWG World Tag Team Champions.

Uno and Grayson were first shown at the end of a Being The Elite episode, when The Young Bucks teased the signing of the Super Smash Brothers.

Professional wrestling career

All Elite Wrestling (2019–present)

On May 25, 2019, at Double or Nothing, Uno and Grayson were repackaged and made their surprise debut as The Dark Order. After Best Friends (Chuck Taylor and Trent) defeated Angélico and Jack Evans, Uno and Grayson appeared ringside after the lights went out, and attacked everyone alongside their masked henchmen (referred to as "creepers"). On July 13, at Fight for the Fallen, they made their AEW in-ring debut in a three-way tag team match defeating Angélico, Evans and Jurassic Express (Jungle Boy and Luchasaurus), advancing to All Out for an opportunity at a first round bye in the AEW World Tag Team Championship tournament. On August 31, at All Out, they defeated Best Friends to receive a first round buy-in for the AEW World Tag Team Championship tournament. They were unsuccessful in the tournament, losing to eventual winners SoCal Uncensored on the October 23 episode of Dynamite.

On November 20, the first of a series of Dark Order vignettes began airing, and in doing so, introduced the spokesman for the stable, who communicated to Alex Reynolds through a hotel television. Then, John Silver and Alex Reynolds joined the Dark Order. On the January 1, 2020 episode of Dynamite, "The Exalted One" was revealed as the title of the Dark Order's mysterious off-screen leader.

The stable's first feud was with SoCal Uncensored, and saw the Order try to recruit Christopher Daniels following his loss to Sammy Guevara. During the following weeks, The Dark Order faced SoCal Uncensored including a victory at Revolution, where Uno and Grayson defeated Kazarian and Scorpio Sky in a tag team match.  On the March 18, 2020 episode of Dynamite, Mr. Brodie Lee made his AEW debut and was revealed as The Exalted One and the leader of The Dark Order, beating up Daniels and Kazarian. Then, Lee would have several squashes against other wrestlers. Also, on the April 22, 2020 episode of Dynamite, Preston Vance joined the stable as 10. On June 5, it was revealed that Alan Angels had been recruited as a new member of the Dark Order under the moniker of 5. He would later debut on the June 9, 2020 episode of AEW Dark.

In May, Colt Cabana began a losing streak as Brodie Lee tried to recruit him into The Dark Order. On the June 10 episode of Dynamite, after Cabana lost to Sammy Guevara, Lee came out to help Cabana to his feet and once again offer him a spot in the Dark Order. Later on in the night, Cabana was seen heading into Lee's office. The following week, Cabana was handed an envelope by Lee that stated they will team together against Joey Janela and Sonny Kiss. At the same time, Brodie Lee extended a hand to Anna Jay after her loss to Abadon. Cabana and Lee would defeat Janela and Kiss after Cabana got the pin on Janela. Over the next few weeks, Cabana would begin a winning streak teaming with members of the Dark Order as he was slowly recruited into the group over time. Anna Jay would later make her first appearance alongside the Dark Order on the July 29 episode of Dynamite. On the August 22 edition of Dynamite, Brodie Lee defeated Cody for the AEW TNT Championship and later gave him back the shattered pieces of the prototype TNT title. On the following episode of Dynamite, after a victory celebration, the Dark Order extended an invitation to Tay Conti to join the group. At All Out on September 5, Lee, Cabana, Evil Uno and Grayson were defeated by Matt Cardona, Scorpio Sky, Dustin Rhodes and Q. T. Marshall in an eight-man tag team match. Lee lost the TNT Championship back to Cody on the October 7 episode of Dynamite. The Dark Order would then more heavily pursue the recruitment of Hangman Page, whom they had made advances towards previously.

In the days prior to Brodie Lee's death on December 26, 2020, his older son, Brodie Jr., nicknamed "Negative 1", was signed to All Elite Wrestling and became a member of his father's faction at the age of 8, with AEW stating that he can start to perform for the company when he becomes an adult if he so wishes. The December 30 episode of AEW Dynamite, known as the "Brodie Lee Celebration of Life", featured Dark Order members winning every match. Following this, Dark Order transitioned into babyfaces as they continued their storyline involving Hangman Page where Silver and Reynolds teamed with Page on several occasions while also still trying to recruit him into the group. However, on the January 20, 2021 episode of Dynamite, Page would politely rebuff their offer, as he felt that he did not work well in groups. At the Revolution event on March 7, Page defeated Matt Hardy; the Dark Order subsequently came down to the ring to celebrate with him. At Fight for the Fallen, Page teamed with the Dark Order to face Omega, the Young Bucks and The Good Brothers (Doc Gallows and Karl Anderson) in a 10-man tag team elimination match, where if Page and the Dark Order won, they would receive matches for the world and tag team championships, respectively. Page and the Dark Order were defeated, with Page being the last man eliminated on his team.

Independent circuit (2019)
Following Double or Nothing, Uno and Grayson were booked for some independent shows, usually against AEW contracted wrestlers, before the premiere of AEW Dynamite in October 2019. This began at Pro Wrestling Guerilla's Sixteen, on July 26, marking their first appearance in the company since 2013, when they were known as the Super Smash Brothers. They defeated Best Friends (Chuck Taylor and Trent) by disqualification, when Trent hit a low blow in retaliation for the Dark Order doing the same when the referee was down. On August 7, at an Oriental Wrestling Entertainment (OWE) show in Toronto, they defeated Strong Hearts (El Lindaman and T-Hawk). The next day, they appeared at a Progress Wrestling show in the same city, but were defeated by Aussie Open (Kyle Fletcher and Mark Davis), in a three-way match, also involving The Butcher and The Blade (Andy Williams and Pepper Parks).

Professional wrestling character
Stu Grayson described The Dark Order as a Scientology-like cult. As part of the gimmick, the stable has tried to recruit people from outside of professional wrestling. The stable also has a website, joindarkorder.com, as a part of their act. During the early days of the stable, Dark Order received a bad reception after a "cold debut" and a "disastrous main-event angle that saw one of The Dark Order's "minions" go viral for throwing blatantly fake punches." Evil Uno and Stu Grayson agreed that the incident hurt their image until Brodie Lee was revealed as the leader of the faction.

Members

Current

Associates

Former

Part-time

Timeline

Sub-groups

Former

Championships and accomplishments
All Elite Wrestling
AEW TNT Championship (1 time) – Lee
 AEW Dynamite Awards (1 time)
 Biggest WTF Moment (2022) - Jay and Conti – 
Pro Wrestling Illustrated
Ranked Cabana No. 115 of the top 500 singles wrestlers in the PWI 500 in 2020
Ranked Vance No. 158 of the top 500 singles wrestlers in the PWI 500 in 2021
Ranked Uno No. 188 of the top 500 singles wrestlers in the PWI 500 in 2021
Ranked Grayson No. 191 of the top 500 singles wrestlers in the PWI 500 in 2021
Ranked Silver No. 247 of the top 500 singles wrestlers in the PWI 500 in 2021
Ranked Reynolds No. 312 of the top 500 singles wrestlers in the PWI 500 in 2020
Ranked Angels No. 351 of the top 500 singles wrestlers in the PWI 500 in 2021

Notes

References

External links

All Elite Wrestling teams and stables
Fictional cults
Independent promotions teams and stables
Masked tag teams